Vadym Ivanovych Milko (born 22 August 1986) is a Ukrainian professional footballer who plays as a central midfielder for Kolos Kovalivka.

References

External links
 
 
 

1986 births
Living people
People from Pervomaisk, Mykolaiv Oblast
Piddubny Olympic College alumni
Ukrainian footballers
Ukraine youth international footballers
Ukraine under-21 international footballers
Association football midfielders
FC Dynamo Kyiv players
FC Dynamo-2 Kyiv players
FC Dynamo-3 Kyiv players
FC Kharkiv players
FC Zorya Luhansk players
FC Vorskla Poltava players
FC Belshina Bobruisk players
FC Slutsk players
NK Veres Rivne players
FC Kolos Kovalivka players
Ukrainian Premier League players
Ukrainian First League players
Ukrainian Second League players
Belarusian Premier League players
Ukrainian expatriate footballers
Expatriate footballers in Belarus
Ukrainian expatriate sportspeople in Belarus
Sportspeople from Mykolaiv Oblast